Klimeschiopsis is a genus of moths in the family Gelechiidae.

Species
 Klimeschiopsis afghana Povolný, 1968
 Klimeschiopsis discontinuella (Rebel, 1899)
 Klimeschiopsis kiningerella (Duponchel, 1843)
 Klimeschiopsis sinevi Bidzilya, 2012
 Klimeschiopsis terroris (Hartig, 1938)

References

 
Gnorimoschemini